Mădălina Ștefania Amăistroaie (born 9 December 2002) is a Romanian archer. She competed in the women's individual event at the 2020 Summer Olympics.

References

External links
 

2002 births
Living people
Romanian female archers
Olympic archers of Romania
Archers at the 2020 Summer Olympics
Place of birth missing (living people)
21st-century Romanian women